Paul Wiener was the first superintendent, or head, of the Transylvanian Saxons' Evangelical Church (in the Kingdom of Hungary) from 1553 to 1556. He started his career as a canon at the Catholic Ljubljana Cathedral, but he became an ardent supporter of Martin Luther's theology. In 1547, he was arrested. After he refused to reject his Evangelical views, he was exiled from Carniola.

Sources

References

Clergy from Ljubljana
Converts to Lutheranism from Roman Catholicism
Laicized Roman Catholic priests